Phenylobacterium lituiforme is a moderately thermophilic, facultative anaerobic and motile bacterium from the genus of Phenylobacterium which has been isolated from the Great Artesian Basin from Queensland in Australia.

References

Caulobacterales
Bacteria described in 2004